Thomas Jones Senn (December 21, 1871 – February 11, 1947) was a decorated United States Navy officer with the rank of rear admiral. He was a recipient of the Navy Cross.

Biography

Thomas Jones Senn was born on December 21, 1871, in the small town of Graniteville, South Carolina. Senn attended the United States Naval Academy at Annapolis, Maryland and graduated in 1891.

Senn served with USS North Dakota in the waters of Atlantic and was awarded the Navy Cross for his leadership of that ship.

After the war, Senn was appointed the commander of the Naval Torpedo Station. He later was promoted to rear admiral and served as Assistant Chief of Naval Operations for three years, from 1925 to 1928.

Senn retired from the Navy in 1936 and died on February 11, 1947, at the age of 75 years at Naval Hospital in San Diego, California. He was buried at Fort Rosecrans National Cemetery together with his wife Percie B. Senn (1874–1950).

Navy Cross citation
Captain Thomas J. Senn was awarded the Navy Cross for action aboard North Dakota during World War I. 
Citation: The Navy Cross is awarded to Captain Thomas J. Senn, U.S. Navy, for exceptionally meritorious service in a duty of great responsibility as commanding officer of the U.S.S. North Dakota, in the Atlantic Fleet.

References

1871 births
1947 deaths
People from Graniteville, South Carolina
United States Naval Academy alumni
United States Navy personnel of World War I
United States Navy admirals
Recipients of the Navy Cross (United States)
Burials at Fort Rosecrans National Cemetery